Beaver Crossing may refer to the following places:

Beaver Crossing, Alberta, Canada
Beaver Crossing, Nebraska, U.S.

See also
Beaver Bridge (disambiguation)
Beaver River (disambiguation)
List of crossings of the Beaver River in Pennsylvania, U.S.